The men's 109 kg competition at the 2018 World Weightlifting Championships was held on 8–9 November 2018.

The International Weightlifting Federation had reorganized the weight categories and discarded all prior world records;
only performances exceeding defined "world standards" were to count as new records.

Schedule

Medalists

Records

Results

New records

References

External links
Results 
Results Group A 
Results Group B
Results Group C

Men's 109 kg